Christos Vasilopoulos (born 12 November 1962) is a former Greek professional footballer who played as a right back.

Club career
Vasilopoulos started his career  at Panachaiki, where he distinguished himself, before he was transferred to AEK Athens in the summer of 1987. He managed to establish himself at the club mainly as a right back, but he was used as a left back, while Dušan Bajević also used him as a sweeper to play one-on-one against the opposition attackers. He was a combative, fast and quite effective defender, who was turned to be a key player for AEK. With the "yellow-blacks", he won 3 championships, a Greek Super Cup in 1989 and the Greek League Cup in 1990, while he was also the captain of the team for the 1992–93 season. He left AEK in the summer of 1993 as his contract was not renewed, ending his professional career at the age of 31.

Later career
In August 2016, Vasilopoulos returned to AEK Athens, assuming a position in the team's infrastructure departments.

Honours

AEK Athens 
Alpha Ethniki: 1988–89, 1991–92, 1992–93
Greek Super Cup: 1989
Greek League Cup: 1990

References

1962 births
Footballers from Patras
Living people
Greek footballers
Super League Greece players
Panachaiki F.C. players
AEK Athens F.C. players
Association football defenders